The Conviction is a 1991 Italian drama film directed by Marco Bellocchio. It was entered into the 41st Berlin International Film Festival where it won the Silver Bear - Special Jury Prize.

Cast
 Vittorio Mezzogiorno as Lorenzo Colajanni
 Andrzej Seweryn as Giovanni
 Claire Nebout as Sandra Celestini
 Grażyna Szapołowska as Monica
 Paolo Graziosi
 Maria Schneider as La contadina
 Claudio Emeri
 Antonio Marziantonio
 Giorgio Panzera
 Fiorella Potenza
 Giovanni Vaccaro
 Tatiana Winteler

References

External links

1991 films
Italian drama films
1990s Italian-language films
1991 drama films
Films directed by Marco Bellocchio
Courtroom films
1990s legal films
Films about rape
Silver Bear Grand Jury Prize winners
1990s Italian films